Ooperipatellus is a genus of Australian and New Zealand velvet worms in the Peripatopsidae family. Species in this genus are oviparous. Most species in this genus have 14 pairs of legs, but O. nanus has only 13 pairs, which is the minimum number found in the phylum Onychophora. Velvet worms in this genus are among the smallest known, with adults often only 10 to 20 millimeters long. Morphological and molecular data indicate that this genus is a monophyletic group.

Species 
The genus contains the following species:

 Ooperipatellus decoratus (Baehr, 1977)
 Ooperipatellus duwilensis Reid, 1996
 Ooperipatellus insignis (Dendy, 1890)
 Ooperipatellus nanus Ruhberg, 1985
 Ooperipatellus nickmayeri Oliveira & Mayer, 2017
 Ooperipatellus parvus Reid, 1996
 Ooperipatellus spenceri Cockerell, 1913
 Ooperipatellus viridimaculatus (Dendy, 1900)

Ooperipatellus cryptus Jackson & Taylor, 1994 is considered a nomen dubium by Oliveira et al., 2012.

References 

Onychophorans of Australasia
Onychophoran genera